The National Humanities Institute is a nonprofit interdisciplinary educational organization founded in 1984.  It is known to be affiliated with traditionalist conservatism.

It publishes Humanitas (journal) and the Epistulae Occasional Papers.

The National Humanities Institute operates the Irving Babbitt Project and the Center for Constitutional Studies.

Claes G. Ryn is the institute's chairman.

Joseph Baldacchino is the institute's president.

Robert F. Ellsworth and Anthony Harrigan serve on its board of trustees.

Among its academic board are George W. Carey, Jude P. Dougherty, David C. Jordan, Ralph Ketcham, Forrest McDonald, Walter A. McDougall, Jacob Neusner, James Seaton, Peter J. Stanlis, and Michael A. Weinstein.

References

External links
National Humanities Institute
Humanitas
Epistulae

Political organizations based in the United States